A partial lunar eclipse took place on Monday, June 14, 1965. At maximum eclipse, a small bite out of the Moon should have been visible. The eclipse lasted for 1 hour and 40 minutes, with just 18% of the Moon in shadow at maximum.

Visibility

Related lunar eclipses

Lunar year series

Half-Saros cycle
A lunar eclipse will be preceded and followed by solar eclipses by 9 years and 5.5 days (a half saros). This lunar eclipse is related to two total solar eclipses of Solar Saros 146.

Saros cycle

See also
List of lunar eclipses
List of 20th-century lunar eclipses

Notes

External links

1965-06
1965 in science
June 1965 events